The exponential factorial is a positive integer n raised to the power of n − 1, which in turn is raised to the power of n − 2, and so on in a right-grouping manner. That is,

 

The exponential factorial can also be defined with the recurrence relation

 

The first few exponential factorials are 1, 1, 2, 9, 262144, ... . For example, 262144 is an exponential factorial since

 
Using the recurrence relation, the first exponential factorials are:
1
11 = 1
21 = 2
32 = 9
49 = 262144
5262144 = 6206069878...8212890625 (183231 digits)

The exponential factorials grow much more quickly than regular factorials or even hyperfactorials. The number of digits in the exponential factorial of 6 is approximately 5 × 10183 230.

The sum of the reciprocals of the exponential factorials from 1 onwards is the following transcendental number:

This sum is transcendental because it is a Liouville number.

Like tetration, there is currently no accepted method of extension of the exponential factorial function to real and complex values of its argument, unlike the factorial function, for which such an extension is provided by the gamma function. But it is possible to expand it if it is defined in a strip width of 1.

Related functions, notation and conventions

References
Jonathan Sondow, "Exponential Factorial" From Mathworld, a Wolfram Web resource

Factorial and binomial topics
Integer sequences
Large integers
Exponentials